The Kikuchi River (菊池川, Kikuchi-gawa) flows through the northern part of Kumamoto Prefecture, Kyūshū, Japan. The source of the river is Fukaba, Aso city near Mt. Aso at the height of 1041 metres and flows west through the Kikuchi Valley. It turns south near Kikusui and empties into the Shimabara Bay in the Ariake sea. Land reclamation is taking place at its mouth.

The river has a total length of 71 km. It begins at an elevation of 1041 meters and has a catchment area of 995 km2. The width of the river ranges from 24 metres to 72 metres and the current velocity and discharge varies greatly through the year, from 10 to 350 cubic metres per second.

References

External links

 (mouth)

Rivers of Kumamoto Prefecture
Rivers of Japan